The 1956 Duke Blue Devils football team represented Duke University during the 1956 NCAA University Division football season.

Schedule

References

Duke
Duke Blue Devils football seasons
Duke Blue Devils football